Emelie Sandra Josefin Irewald, (born 15 June 1984, in Stockholm) is a Swedish singer. In 2011 she participated in the singing competition True Talent which was broadcast on TV3. In the competition she placed fourth. Irewald will participate in Melodifestivalen 2015 with the song "Där och då med dig" which she wrote herself.

During a few months in her teens she dated True Talent coach and singer Danny Saucedo, though during the competition Irewald chose Tommy Körbergs team.

References

Living people
1984 births
21st-century Swedish singers
21st-century Swedish women singers
Melodifestivalen contestants of 2015